Caister may refer to several places in the English county of Norfolk:

the seaside resort of Caister-on-Sea
the nearby village of West Caister